Hyposemansis is a genus of moths in the family Erebidae. The genus was erected by George Hampson in 1895.

Species
Hyposemansis albipuncta (Wileman, 1914) Taiwan
Hyposemansis asbolaea (Lower, 1903) Queensland
Hyposemansis cryptosema Hampson, 1926 New Guinea
Hyposemansis lasiophora Hampson, 1926 Borneo
Hyposemansis mediopallens Wileman & West, 1929 Philippines (Luzon)
Hyposemansis singha (Guenée, 1852) Calcutta, Silhet, Taiwan, Sumatra
Hyposemansis volvapex Kobes, 1994

References

Pangraptinae
Moth genera